Shkëlzen Haradinaj (25 March 1970 – 16 April 1999) was a Kosovo Liberation Army (KLA) soldier and commander who died during the battle against Serbian forces in the Maznik Mountains near Deçan.

Early life
Shkelzen was born on 25 March 1970 in the village of Glloxhan, near Deçan, in Kosovo, then part of Yugoslavia. His paternal descent is from Berishë in northern Albania, around the city of Pukë.

Military career

Upon learning of the attack by Serbian forces on Adem Jashari and his family in Prekaz killing over 42 people in March 1998, Shkelzen Haradinaj, with friends operating in the Dukagjin sub-zone, carried out over 22 armed actions against Serbian police bases overnight of the Serbian paramilitary in the Dukagjin region.

Shkelzen Haradinaj took part in the Battle of Glođane alongside brothers Ramush Haradinaj and Daut Haradinaj, first cousin Bujar and other fighters, such as Gazmend Mehmetaj, Agron Mehmetaj and Hima Haradinaj, who was the first fallen in frontal war in the Dukagjin Zone.

Death
On 16 April 1999, in the Maznik Mountains near Deçan, Shkelzen Haradinaj and his Special Unit of the KLA marched to the Maznik Mountains in order to battle against Serbian forces. Shkelzen Haradinaj was killed alongside fellow soldiers and comrades Fatmir Nimanaj, Hasim Halilaj and Luan Nimanaj.

Personal life
Shkëlzen Haradinaj was married and had two sons Shqipdon and Luan Haradinaj (named after his dead brother Luan Haradinaj). Shqipdon died in 2007 after a car accident, aged only 11. His other son, Luan Haradinaj, is today a soldier of Kosovo Security Force.

References

1970 births
1999 deaths
Kosovo Liberation Army soldiers
Military personnel killed in the Kosovo War